"Hungry" is a single by American rock band Winger, from their album Winger. Released as a single in 1989, the song charted at No. 85 in the US.  The B-side was "Time To Surrender", taken from the same album. A music video was released which dealt with a man falling into a depression after his new wife dies in a car crash. In the beginning of the music video, before the car crashes, the song "Headed for a Heartbreak" can be heard playing on the radio.

Charts

References

Winger (band) songs
1989 singles
Song recordings produced by Beau Hill
Songs written by Kip Winger
1988 songs
Atlantic Records singles
Songs written by Reb Beach